Callophrys fotis is a species of butterfly in the family Lycaenidae, the gossamer-winged butterflies. It is known by several common names, including early elfin, desert elfin, Fotis hairstreak, Strecker's elfin, and Arizona gray elfin. It is native to the southwestern United States, where it occurs in southeastern California, Nevada, Utah, western Colorado, northern Arizona, and northwestern New Mexico.

This butterfly has a wingspan of 19 to 28 millimeters. It is gray on the upperside and brownish gray on the underside. The hindwing has a darker base and a grayish to yellow-gray tip.

This species occurs in desert habitat, especially pinyon-juniper woodland. Its host plants are Stansbury's cliffrose (Purshia stansburiana) and related species. Males perch on the plants awaiting females, which then deposit eggs on the flower buds. The caterpillars feed on the flowers and developing fruits and pupate over the winter in the litter beneath the plant. Adults fly from March through May.

Subspecies
Subspecies include:
 Callophrys fotis fotis 
 Callophrys fotis mojavensis (Austin, 1998)

References

Callophrys
Butterflies described in 1878
Fauna of the Southwestern United States
Taxa named by Herman Strecker
Butterflies of North America